Zasyadko may refer to:

Alexander Dmitrievich Zasyadko (1779–1837), Russian rocket gunner
Zasyadko (crater), a crater on the Moon
Zasyadko coal mine, a coal mine in Donetsk, Ukraine
2007 Zasyadko mine disaster, a disaster that killed 101 miners